Zuleica Wilson (born March 17, 1993)  is an Angolan model and beauty pageant titleholder who was crowned Miss Angola 2013 and represented her country at the Miss Universe 2014 pageant. She will also represent her country at the Miss Intercontinental 2015 pageant.

Early life
Zuleica is a student business and management at Lusíada University.

Pageantry

Miss Cabinda 2013
Zuleica Was Crowned As Miss Cabinda 2013 And As Official Candidate For The National Pageant, Miss Angola 2013.

Miss Angola 2013
Zuleica was crowned as Miss Angola 2013. She represented Cabinda at the pageant. The prestigious pageant in Angola, Miss Angola pageant was held at the Belas Conference Centre, Luanda, Angola.

Miss Universe 2014
Wilson participated in Miss Universe 2014, held in Doral, Florida, USA, but failed to advance to the Top 15.

References

External links
Official Miss Angola website

1993 births
Living people
Miss Angola winners
Angolan beauty pageant winners
Angolan female models
Miss Universe 2014 contestants
People from Cabinda (city)